KHAT (1210 AM) is a radio station broadcasting a country music format. Licensed to Laramie, Wyoming, United States. The station is currently owned by Appaloosa Broadcasting Company, Inc. The station is branded as "New Country 96.7" due to it having an additional FM translator, K244FN, which also serves Laramie.

History
The station was assigned the call letters KLDI on November 1, 1985.  On March 25, 2002, the station changed its call sign to KRRR. On April 1, 2002, the station became KKHI. Finally, on December 1, 2003, it became the current call letters KHAT. Prior to obtaining its current format (and call letters), the station carried an oldies format, followed by sports radio from ESPN Radio, before switching to country in early 2012 upon the translator launch.

References

External links

HAT
Radio stations established in 1985
1985 establishments in Wyoming
Country radio stations in the United States